Lake Temenggor Bridge is the longest highway bridge on the East-West Highway, (Federal Route 4). Opened on 1 July 1982, the bridge crosses Lake Temenggor, a hydroelectric dam in Perak, Malaysia. There are two sections of the bridge, in west side (880 metres) and east side (640 metres).

See also
 Transport in Malaysia

1982 establishments in Malaysia
Box girder bridges
Bridges completed in 1982
Bridges in Perak
Hulu Perak District